The current academic dress of the National University of Ireland was simplified following a review in 1999. The design of the gowns generally follows that of Oxford. The hoods are primarily green, representing Ireland, and generally follow the design of Dublin or Belfast.

Academic dress is currently worn during formal occasions such as conferring ceremonies at the constituent universities and recognised colleges, except for University College Dublin, where the traditional academic dress was removed in 2013 in favour of a more simple design.

Faculty colours
The faculty colours form an important part of the academic dress of the University, and distinguish graduates from different disciplines. In addition to the colours below, blue is used to represent Arts in the lining of the MA hood, as otherwise it would be the same as that of the DLitt. It is also used for non-degree qualifications in Arts. The Maroon Colour is used to represent philosophy in a general sense in the PhD gowns, and does not represent the academic field of philosophy.

Components
After the names of the components, the number associated with the Groves classification system is given in square brackets.

Gowns

There are two types of Doctoral gowns. The undress gown is used for ordinary occasions and the full dress gown is for formal and ceremonial occasions. The undress gown is as the Master's gown. The specifications below are for full dress.

Hoods

An exception to the below specifications is the MA hood, which, although not designated as one of the NUI faculty colours, is lined in blue in order to distinguish it from the DLitt hood. Blue is now also used for the lining of Postgraduate/Higher Diploma, Diploma and Certificate hoods for the faculties of Arts.

Caps
Doctors in full dress wear black velvet caps of the doctoral bonnet shape [h2], with cords and tassels gold for higher doctors and of the faculty colour for PhDs and professional doctors. Other graduates and doctors in undress may wear a black mortar board [h1].

Academic Dress of University Officers

Chancellor
The Chancellor wears a traditional court style gown with inverted 'T' sleeve openings.

Vice-Chancellor
The Vice-Chancellor has a similar gown, without the square collar, so the style of the University's gown for the Degree of Doctor

Pro-Vice-Chancellor
Similar to the Vice-Chancellor's gown.

Registrar
Similar to the Vice-Chancellor's gown, but with smaller and shorter sleeves.

Academic Dress at University College Dublin
The unique scheme for University College Dublin removes the faculty colours and has only one hood, gown and cap for each level of degree. It departs from tradition by having a doctoral gown that is not scarlet.

Gowns

Hoods

Caps
Doctors wear black velvet caps of the doctoral bonnet shape [h2], with gold cord and tassel. Other graduates may wear a black mortar board [h1].

References

National University of Ireland
National University of Ireland
Academia in the Republic of Ireland